(it can also be written as written as  or ) is a Vietnamese traditional cake.  is a white, flat, and round glutinous rice cake. They are wrapped in cut pieces of banana leaves. Another variation is called , where ground boiled mung bean - salted or sweetened - is stuffed inside. It is very similar to other Asian glutinous rice cakes like Japanese , Korean  or Chinese .

Traditional story of  
Emperor Hùng Vương had many sons. Some pursued literary careers. Others excelled in martial arts. The youngest prince named Lang Liêu, however, loved neither. Instead, he and his wife and their children chose the countryside where they farmed the land.

One day, toward the end of the year, the emperor met with all his sons. He told them whoever brought him the most special and unusual food would be made the new emperor. Almost immediately, the princes left for their homes and started looking for the most delicious food to offer the emperor. Some went hunting in the forests and brought home birds and animals which they prepared into the most palatable dishes. Some others sailed out to the open sea, trying to catch fish, lobsters and other much loved sea food. Neither the rough sea nor the violent weather could stop them from looking for the best gifts to please the emperor.

In his search, Lang Liêu went back to the countryside. He saw that the rice in his paddy fields was ripe and ready to be harvested, Walking by a glutinous rice field, he picked some golden grains on a long stalk. He brought them close to his nose and he could smell a delicate aroma.

His entires family then set out to harvest the rice, Lang Liêu himself ground the glutinous rice grains into fine flour. His wife mixed it with water into a soft paste. His children helped by building a fire and wrapping the cakes with leaves. In no time, they finished, and in front of them lay two kinds of cakes: one was round and the other was square in shape.

The round cake was made with glutinous rice dough and was called  by Lang Liêu. He named the square shaped cake  which he made with rice, green beans wrapped in leaves. Everybody was extremely happy with the new kind of cakes.

On the first day of Spring, the princes took the gifts of their labor and love to the emperor. One carried a delicious dish of steamed fish and mushrooms. Another brought with him a roasted peacock and some lobsters. All the food was beautifully cooked.

Seeing Lang Liêu's simple offerings, other princes sneered at them. But after tasting all the food brought to court by his sons, the emperor decided that the first prize should be awarded to Lang Liêu.

The emperor then said that his youngest son's gifts were not only the purest, but also the most meaningful because Lang Liêu had used nothing except rice which was the basic foodstuff of the people to make them. The emperor gave up the throne and make Lang Liêu the new emperor. All the other princes bowed to show respect and congratulated the new emperor.

References

Rice cakes
Bánh